Fabio Bollini (born 19 September 1983) is a former defender from San Marino. He last played for Libertas and also featured for the San Marino national football team.

References

Sammarinese footballers
San Marino international footballers
1983 births
S.S. Murata players
Living people

Association football midfielders